Orji Okwonkwo (born 19 January 1998) is a Nigerian professional footballer who plays as a striker for Serie A club Bologna.

Club career

He signed for Bologna in August 2016. On 20 November 2016, Okwonkwo made his debut in Serie A with Bologna in a victory against Palermo. On 24 September 2017, Okwonkwo scored his first Serie A goal against Sassuolo.

On 31 January 2018, Okwonkwo signed a loan contract with Brescia until 30 June 2018.

On 12 February 2019, Okwonkwo signed a loan contract with the Montreal Impact until 31 December 2019. On 24 January 2020, Montreal Impact re-acquired Okwonkwo on a loan with a purchase option at the end of the 2020 season. He said he was looking forward to working with manager Thierry Henry.

On 1 February 2021, Okwonkwo moved to Serie B side Reggina, on a loan deal until the end of the season.

On 24 July 2021 he joined Cittadella on loan.

International career
Okwonkwo represented Nigeria under-17 at the 2015 FIFA U-17 World Cup, winning the tournament.

Career statistics

Honours
Montreal Impact
 Canadian Championship: 2019

Nigeria U17
 FIFA U-17 World Cup: 2015

References

1998 births
Living people
Association football forwards
Bologna F.C. 1909 players
Brescia Calcio players
Expatriate footballers in Italy
Expatriate soccer players in Canada
CF Montréal players
Reggina 1914 players
A.S. Cittadella players
Nigerian expatriate footballers
Nigerian expatriate sportspeople in Canada
Nigerian expatriate sportspeople in Italy
Nigerian footballers
Serie A players
Serie B players
Sportspeople from Benin City
Major League Soccer players
Nigeria youth international footballers